Euripus or Euripos was a town in ancient Acarnania. It is known mainly through epigraphic evidence, including the appointment of theorodokoi of the place is mentioned towards the year 356/5 BCE to host theoroi of Epidaurus and also in another entry dated in the period 331/0-313 BCE to receive the theoroi of Nemea. It was a member of the Acarnanian League in the 3rd century BCE. It is also mentioned in the Periplus of Pseudo-Scylax.

Its site is located near the modern Rouga.

References

See also
List of cities in ancient Epirus

Populated places in ancient Acarnania
Former populated places in Greece
Cities in ancient Epirus